Sony Music Entertainment (SME), simply known as Sony Music, is an American multinational music company owned by Sony Entertainment and managed by the American umbrella division of Japanese multinational conglomerate Sony. It is the recording division half of the Sony Music Group, with the other half being the publishing division, Sony Music Publishing (formerly Sony/ATV).

Founded in 1929 as American Record Corporation, it was acquired by the Columbia Broadcasting System in 1938 and renamed Columbia Recording Corporation. In 1966, the company was reorganized to become CBS Records. Its ownership was transferred to Sony who renamed it to its current name in 1991. Sony and Bertelsmann established a 50-50 joint venture known as Sony BMG in 2004 to handle the operations of Sony Music and Bertelsmann Music Group, but Sony acquired Bertelsmann's stake 4 years later and reverted to using the 1991 company name branding. This buyout incorporated and eventually absorbed labels formerly under BMG ownership like Arista, Jive, LaFace and J Records into former BMG and currently Sony's co-flagship record label, RCA Records, in 2011 and led to the relaunch of BMG as BMG Rights Management. Arista Records would later be revived in 2018.

As of 2023, Sony Music Entertainment is the second largest of the "Big Three" record companies, behind Universal Music Group and followed by Warner Music Group. Its music publishing division Sony Music Publishing (formerly Sony/ATV) is the largest music publisher in the world.

On July 17, 2019, Sony announced a merger of Sony Music Entertainment and Sony/ATV to form the Sony Music Group. The merger was completed on August 1, 2019.

History

1929–1938: American Record Corporation 

The American Record Corporation (ARC) was founded in 1929 through a merger of several record companies. The company grew for the next several years, acquiring other brands such as the Columbia Phonograph Company, including its Okeh Records subsidiary, in 1934.

1938–1970: Columbia/CBS Records 
In 1938, ARC was acquired by the Columbia Broadcasting System (CBS) under the guidance of chief executive William S. Paley. The company was later renamed Columbia Recording Corporation, and changed again to Columbia Records Inc. in 1947. Edward Wallerstein, who served as the head of Columbia Records since the late 1930s, helped establish the company as a leader in the record industry by spearheading the successful introduction of the LP record. Columbia's success continued through the 1950s with the launch of Epic Records in 1953 and Date Records in 1958. By 1962, the Columbia Records productions unit was operating four plants around the United States located in Los Angeles, California; Terre Haute, Indiana; Bridgeport, Connecticut; and Pitman, New Jersey.

Columbia's international arm was launched in 1962 under the name "CBS Records", as the company only owned the rights to the Columbia name in North America. In 1964, the company began acquiring record companies in other countries for its CBS Records International unit and established its own UK distribution outfit with the acquisition of Oriole Records.

By 1966, Columbia was renamed as CBS Records and was a separate unit of the parent company, CBS-Columbia Group. In March 1968, CBS and Sony formed CBS/Sony Records, a Japanese business joint venture.

1971–1991: CBS Records Group 

In 1971, CBS Records was expanded into its own "CBS Records Group", with Clive Davis as its administrative vice president and general manager. In the 1980s to the early 1990s, the company managed several successful labels, including CBS Associated Records, which signed artists including Ozzy Osbourne, the Fabulous Thunderbirds, Electric Light Orchestra, Joan Jett, and Henry Lee Summer. In 1983, CBS expanded its music publishing business by acquiring the music publishing arm of MGM/UA Communications Co. (CBS later sold the print music arm to Columbia Pictures.) By 1987, CBS was the only "big three" American TV network to have a co-owned record company. With Sony being one of the developers behind the compact disc digital music media, a compact disc production plant was constructed in Japan under the joint venture, allowing CBS to begin supplying some of the first compact disc releases for the American market in 1983.

In 1986, CBS sold its music publishing division, CBS Songs, to SBK Entertainment On November 17, 1987, Sony acquired CBS Records for US$2 billion. CBS Inc., now Paramount Global, retained the rights to the CBS name for music recordings but granted Sony a temporary license to use the CBS name. The sale was completed on January 5, 1988. CBS Corporation founded a new CBS Records in 2006, which was distributed by Sony through its RED subsidiary.

In 1989, CBS Records re-entered the music publishing business by acquiring Nashville-based Tree International Publishing.

1991–2004: Birth of Sony Music Entertainment 
Sony renamed the record company Sony Music Entertainment (SME) on January 1, 1991, fulfilling the terms set under the 1988 buyout, which granted only a transitional license to the CBS trademark. The CBS Associated label was renamed Epic Associated. Also on January 1, 1991, to replace the CBS label, Sony reintroduced the Columbia label worldwide, which it previously held in the United States and Canada only, after it acquired the international rights to the trademark from EMI in 1990. Japan is the only country where Sony does not have rights to the Columbia name as it is controlled by Nippon Columbia, an unrelated company. Thus, Sony Music Entertainment Japan issues labels under Sony Records. The Columbia Records trademark's rightsholder in Spain was Bertelsmann Music Group, Germany, which Sony Music subsequently subsumed via a 2004 merger, and a subsequent 2008 buyout.

In 1995, Sony and Michael Jackson formed a joint venture which merged Sony's music publishing operations with Jackson's ATV Music to form Sony/ATV Music Publishing.

2004–2008: Sony BMG: Joint venture with Bertelsmann 

In August 2004, Sony entered a joint venture with an equal partner Bertelsmann, by merging Sony Music and Bertelsmann Music Group, Germany, to establish Sony BMG Music Entertainment. However Sony continued to operate its Japanese music business independently from Sony BMG while BMG Japan was made part of the merger.

The merger made Columbia and Epic sister labels to RCA Records, which was once owned by CBS rival, NBC. It also started the process of bringing BMG's Arista Records back under common ownership with its former parent Columbia Pictures, a Sony division since 1989, and also brought Arista founder Clive Davis back into the fold. As of 2017, Davis was still with Sony Music as a chief creative officer.

2008–present: Sony Music revival, restructuring and recent developments 
On August 5, 2008, Sony Corporation of America (SCA) and Bertelsmann announced that Sony had agreed to acquire Bertelsmann's 50% stake in Sony BMG. The company completed the acquisition on October 1, 2008. On July 1, 2009, SME and IODA announced a strategic partnership to leverage worldwide online retail distribution networks and complementary technologies to support independent labels and music rights holders. In March 2010, Sony Corp partnered with The Michael Jackson Company in a contract of more than $250 million, the largest deal in recorded music history.

From 2009 to 2020, Sony owned 50% of Syco Entertainment, which operates some of the world's most successful reality TV formats, including Got Talent and The X Factor with Simon Cowell. Cowell acquired Sony's stake in 2020.

Doug Morris, who was head of Warner Music Group, and later Universal Music, became chairman and CEO of Sony Music Entertainment on July 1, 2011. Sony Music underwent restructuring upon Morris' arrival; with some artists switching labels while other labels were eliminated altogether.

In June 2012, a consortium led by Sony/ATV acquired EMI Music Publishing, making Sony/ATV the world's largest music publisher at the time. This acquisition also reunited the common ownership of pre-1986 CBS Songs (as SBK Songs) catalog to Sony/ATV.

Rob Stringer became CEO of Sony Music Entertainment on April 1, 2017. He previously served as chairman and CEO of Columbia Records.

Sony has experienced a number of changes with its international labels. In February 2012, Sony Music reportedly closed its Filipino office due to piracy, and Ivory Music and Video had been handling distribution for its catalog a few months earlier in July 2011. In early 2018, their distribution deal with Ivory expired and SME resumed its  operations in the Philippines, with the new offices still located in Ortigas Center, Pasig. In July 2013, Sony Music withdrew from the Greek market due to an economic crisis. Albums released by Sony Music in Greece from domestic and foreign artists would then be carried by Feelgood Records.

In June 2017, Sony announced that by March 2018 it would be producing vinyl records in-house for the first time since ceasing its production in 1989. Reporting the decision, the BBC noted that, "Sony's move comes a few months after it equipped its Tokyo studio with a cutting lathe, used to produce the master discs needed for manufacturing vinyl records" but added that "Sony is even struggling to find older engineers who know how to make records".

On February 5, 2019, a group of 1970s-era musicians including David Johansen and John Waite filed lawsuits accusing Sony Music Entertainment and UMG Recordings, Inc. of improperly refusing to let them reclaim the rights to songs they had signed away earlier in their careers. The lawsuit cites U.S. copyright law, which gives artists who formerly bargained away their rights on unfavorable terms a chance to reclaim those rights by filing termination notices after 35 years. The plaintiffs claim that Sony and UMG have “routinely and systematically” ignored hundreds of notices, having taken the position that recordings are “works made for hire” and are therefore not subject to being reclaimed.

In April 2021, the Brazilian media company Grupo Globo sold its domestic record label Som Livre to Sony Music for an undisclosed amount. It was approved by the Administrative Council for Economic Defense on November 4, 2021.

In 2022, Sony Music Entertainment acquired boutique branding and merchandising agency, Ceremony of Roses(CoR). The newly acquired company would merge with Sony's existing merch division and continue under the CoR banner. The merger brought together artists like Lil Nas X, Olivia Rodrigo, and Adele under one merchandising house. According to Sony, the move will help expand their merchandising team and take artists' merch to the next level.

In January 2023, Sony Music and Alamo Records founder Todd Moscowitz launched Santa Anna, an artist and label services company.

Sony Music UK 
Sony Music UK (legal name Sony Music Entertainment UK Limited) is owned and operated by Sony Music Entertainment in the United Kingdom. Since 2014, Jason Iley has been chairman and CEO of Sony Music UK. Though owned by Sony Music Entertainment, Sony Music UK has standalone operations in the UK to promote musicians within the UK.

In June 2017, it was announced that Sony would be merging its two independent distribution companies The Orchard and Red Essential.

2014 saw Sony's best singles success for 33 years, with 11 number 1 singles. Sony Music artists won a total of five individual awards at the BRITs 2015, including Best Female Solo Artist for Paloma Faith, and Mark Ronson's "Uptown Funk", which picked up Best British Single. Several other of the label's artists - Foo Fighters, One Direction and Pharrell Williams - also collected awards.

Sony's performance at the BRITs 2015 was the label's best in nearly 20 years, winning a total of 5 awards. In 2017, Sony Music UK celebrated the most successful BRIT Awards in the company's history, winning seven of the 11 awards.

In the last three years, Sony Music UK has made key acquisitions including forming Insanity Records with Insanity Management. Craig David became the first artist to sign an album deal with Insanity Records. Sony Music UK signed Robbie Williams, who released his 11th album The Heavy Entertainment Show in 2016. Jason Iley commented that the agreement was "a once in a lifetime signing with the biggest male solo artist of our generation".

Sony Music UK also incorporated the independent sales and distribution company Essential Music and Marketing - renamed to Red Essential. In August 2016, Sony Music acquired Ministry of Sound Recordings, home to London Grammar, DJ Fresh and Sigala.

On April 5, 2017, two of Sony Music UK's labels won awards at the annual Music Week Awards. Columbia Records received the 'A&R of the Year' Award, while Syco were awarded the 'Record Company of the Year' Award.

In 2021, Sony agreed to buy Kobalt neighboring rights division and independent distribution company AWAL, from the Kobalt Music Group for $430 million.

The UK media company Somethin' Else was acquired outright by Sony Music in 2021, to form a podcast division.

Controversies

CD price fixing 

Between 1995 and 2000, music companies were found to have used illegal marketing agreements such as minimum advertised pricing to artificially inflate prices of compact discs. This was done in order to end price wars of the early 1990s among discounters such as Best Buy and Target. A settlement was reached in 2002 that included music publishers and distributors Sony Music, Warner Music, Bertelsmann Music Group, EMI Music and Universal Music. In restitution for price fixing, they agreed to pay a $67.4 million fine and distribute $75.7 million in CDs to public and non-profit groups but admitted no wrongdoing. It is estimated that customers were overcharged by nearly $500 million overall and up to $5 per album.

George Michael 

The British artist, George Michael, signed to Columbia in the U.S. and Epic worldwide, advised Sony executives in 1990 that he would not be appearing in music videos to support his forthcoming album, Listen Without Prejudice, Vol. 1. Michael then accused Sony of not promoting the album at all. He sued in the UK in 1992, asking to be released from his contract. Sony ultimately prevailed in the courts in 1994, but Michael's contract was bought out by other labels. Some 11 years later, Michael licensed tracks to Sony for release.

Michael Jackson and Tommy Mottola 
The release of Invincible was preceded by a dispute between Michael Jackson and Sony Music Entertainment. Jackson had expected the licenses to the masters of his albums to revert to him sometime in the early 2000s, after which he would be able to promote the material however he pleased and keep the profits; however, clauses in the contract set the revert date years into the future. Jackson discovered that the attorney who had represented him in the deal had also been representing Sony. He was also concerned that for years Sony had been pressuring him to sell his share in its music catalog venture; he feared that Sony might have had a conflict of interest, since if Jackson's career failed, he would have had to sell his share of the catalog at a low price. Jackson sought an early exit from his contract.
	
In July 2002, Jackson alleged that the then-Sony Music chairman Tommy Mottola was a "devil" and "racist" who did not support his African-American artists, using them merely for his own gain. He charged that Mottola had called his colleague Irv Gotti a "fat nigger". Sony refused to renew Jackson's contract, and claimed that a  promotional campaign had failed because Jackson refused to tour in the United States.

Prosecution of copyright infringement 
In May 2012, Sony Music filed charges against the website IsoHunt. The plaintiff's claims in the court document filed at the Supreme Court of British Columbia read: "The IsoHunt Websites have been designed and are operated by the defendants with the sole purpose of profiting from rampant copyright infringement which defendants actively encourage, promote, authorize, induce, aid, abet, materially contribute to and commercially profit from." In February 2016, in a lawsuit filed at a California federal court, Sony Music Entertainment and its associated brands (Arista Records and LaFace Records, formerly owned by Bertelsmann Music Group) accused Belgian radio aggregator Radionomy (owned by Universal Music Group's parent Vivendi) of copyright infringement.

2016 boycott 

In February 2016, 100,000 people signed an online petition in less than 24 hours, calling for a boycott of Sony Music and all other Sony-affiliated businesses after rape allegations against music producer Dr. Luke were made by musical artist Kesha. Kesha asked a New York City Supreme Court to free her from her contract with Sony Music, but the court denied the request, prompting a widespread public and media response.

List of Sony Music Entertainment labels

Flagship record labels 
 Columbia Records
 RCA Records
 Epic Records
 Arista Records

Genre-limited record labels 
Country music
 Sony Music Nashville
 Columbia Nashville
 Arista Nashville
 RCA Records Nashville
Dance/electronic music
 Epic Amsterdam
 Stmpd Rcrds
 EEM Records
 Ultra Music
 Ministry of Sound
 Liquid State (joint-venture)
Christian/gospel music
 Provident Label Group
 RCA Inspiration
 Kingdom Life Records
 DeJountae Records
Latin
 Sony Music Latin
Classical/jazz music
 Sony Masterworks
 Sony Classical Records
 Milan Records
 Portrait Records
 RCA Red Seal Records
 Okeh Records
 Flying Buddha
 Masterworks Broadway
Metal music
 Century Media Records
Progressive music
 Inside Out Music

Others 

 Sony Music UK
Columbia Records UK
Relentless Records
5K Records
Black Butter Records (joint-venture)
Dream Life Records
Insanity Records (joint-venture)
Magic Star
Robots + Humans
Since ’93
Sony Music Nashville UK
WEAREBLK (joint-venture)
District 18 Entertainment (joint-venture)

Distributed labels
 Robbins Entertainment
 Syco Music
 Nick Records

Catalog
 Legacy Recordings
 Follow That Dream Records
 Louder Than Life Records

International
 Ariola Records Intl.
 Defstar Records Intl.
 Relentless Records
 Som Livre

Independent music distribution
 The Orchard
 RED Music
 IODA
AWAL

Previously affiliated labels 

 19 Recordings (2001–2010) (previously through BMG and RCA Music Group, now distributed by BMG Rights Management)
 Def Jam Recordings (1985–1994) (previously through Columbia Records, now part of Universal Music Group)
 Loud Records (1992–2002) (previously through Zoo Entertainment, then RCA Records, and later Columbia Records, now a new company called SRC Records through Universal Music Group)
 Chaos Recordings (1993–1995) (previously part of Columbia Records, now dissolved)
 The Work Group (1993–2000) (previously through Epic Records, now dissolved)
 Date Records (1958–1970) (previously through Columbia Records, now dissolved)
 Aware Records (1997–2010) (now part of Universal Music Group through Republic Records)
 PiperWorld Entertainment (2008–2013) (previously through Columbia Records)
 Roc Nation (2009–2013) (previously through Columbia Records; now distributed by Universal Music Group)
 The Echo Label (2013–2017) (owned by BMG Chrysalis; now distributed by Warner Music Group)
 Volcano Entertainment (1996–2019) (previously through Zomba Label Group and later RCA Records, now dissolved)

See also 

 List of Sony Music artists
 Sony Music Publishing
 Sony BMG
 Sony BMG copy protection rootkit scandal
 Sony Music Entertainment Japan
 Sony Music Australia
 Sony Music UK
 Sony Music India
 Tero Entertainment
 Lists of record labels

References

External links 
 
 Yahoo! – Sony Music Entertainment Company Profile via Yahoo! Business
 
 Sony Music TV
 

Sony Music
American companies established in 1929
Companies based in New York City
IFPI members
Record label distributors
Entertainment companies established in 1929
Recording Industry Association of America
American subsidiaries of foreign companies